Bethlehem Catholic High School, more commonly referred to as Becahi or just Beca, is a parochial high school located in Bethlehem, Pennsylvania. The school is within the Diocese of Allentown and is located at 2133 Madison Avenue in Bethlehem in the Lehigh Valley region of eastern Pennsylvania. 

As of 2020-21, the school had 678 students, according to National Center for Education Statistics data.

Athletics

Bethlehem Catholic High School competes athletically in the Eastern Pennsylvania Conference (EPC) in the District XI division of the Pennsylvania Interscholastic Athletic Association, one of the premier high school athletic divisions in the nation. Home athletic events are held on the campus of Bethlehem Catholic High School while football games are played at the 14,000 capacity Frank Banko Field at Bethlehem Area School District Stadium, one of Pennsylvania's largest high school stadiums.

State championships
Boys basketball
1960 PCIAA Class B State Champions
1962 PCIAA Class B State Champions

Girls basketball 
1993 Class AAA runner-up (North Catholic 62–42) 
2013 Class AAA runner-up (South Park 53–38) 
2017 Class AAAA State Champions (Villa Maria 46–27)
2019 Class AAAA State Champions (North Catholic 49–60)

Football:   
Pennsylvania state champions, first two-time champion in PIAA football championship history.
1988 Class  AA champions (inaugural year of State playoffs)
1990 Class AAA champions

Softball
2009 Class AAA State runner-up (9 innings 1–0) 
2014 Class AAA State runner-up 
2015 Class AAA State Champions

Track and Field 
2002 Class AA State Boys Team runner-up
2003 Class AA State Boys Team Champions

Boys volleyball 
2012 Class AA State Champions

Girls volleyball
2014 Class AA State Champions

Wrestling: Individual championships  
2011 Class  AA State Duels Champions (team duels) - Ranked #15 nationally by WIN Magazine.
2012 Class  AA State Duels Champions (team duels) - Ranked #12 nationally by Inter-Mat.
2013 Class  AA State Duels Champions (team duels)
2014 Class AA State Duels Champions 
2016 Class AAA State Duels Champions 
2017 Class AAA State Duels Runner-up

Wrestling: Team championships
1979 Class AAA State Team Champions  (2 State Champions)
2012 Class AA State Team Champions (3 State Champions & 1 runner-up)
2013 Class AA State Team Champions (1 State Champion & 1 runner-up)
2014 Class AA State Team Champions (3 State Champions & 1 runner-up)

Notable alumni
Richard Fuisz, physician and inventor
Mike Guman, former professional football player, Los Angeles Rams
Dan Kendra, former Florida State quarterback
Joe Kovacs, two-time Olympic silver medalist and world champion in shot put
Sean Leary, college baseball coach, Lehigh Mountain Hawks
Zach Makovsky, former professional mixed martial arts fighter, Ultimate Fighting Championship
Jim Molinaro, former professional football player, Dallas Cowboys and Washington Redskins
Daniel Roebuck, film and television actor, ABC's Lost, CBS's Matlock, and The Fugitive  
John Spagnola, former professional football player, Green Bay Packers, Philadelphia Eagles and Seattle Seahawks
Joseph Uliana, former Pennsylvania State Representative

Notable faculty
James McConlogue, former head collegiate football coach, Lafayette College

References

External links
Official website
Bethlehem Catholic High School athletics official website
Bethlehem Catholic High School on Facebook
Bethlehem Catholic High School on Twitter
Bethlehem Catholic High School athletics on Twitter
Bethlehem Catholic High School profile at Niche
Bethlehem Catholic High School sports coverage at The Express-Times

1925 establishments in Pennsylvania
Bethlehem, Pennsylvania
Catholic secondary schools in Pennsylvania
Educational institutions established in 1925
Private high schools in the Lehigh Valley
Roman Catholic Diocese of Allentown
Schools in Northampton County, Pennsylvania